No Man Stands Alone is BANTU's 4th studio album. It is features collaborations and duets by Ade Bantu and mostly Nigerian artists The only international feature is Ghanaian musician Wanlov The Kubolor on the Afrobeat inspired track "Travel & Sea"."I'm Waiting" a duet with Nigerian Songstress Nneka was released as the official soundtrack of Andy Amadi Okoroafor's movie Relentless starring Nneka and Gideon Okeke 84 year old legendary Highlife musician Fatai Rolling Dollar is credited as a guitarist and vocalist on "Ni Bo L’anlo".

Recording and production 
"No Man Stands Alone" marks a radical change in BANTU's album production style as most of it was recorded, mixed and produced in Nigeria. The tracks "Dem Dey Lie" & "Lost My Faith" where mixed by Rub Nuca & Hopetone Blazze in Cologne, Germany while "Travel & Sea" was mixed by Panji Arnoff in Accra, Ghana. The album production credits cite various studios across Lagos and an array of established and emerging producers from Nigeria like composer & songwriter Del B ("Marching To Aso") who would later go on to produce a string of hits for local & international pop acts. The album theme's center around Nigerian politics with songs like "Marching To Aso", "Dem Dey Lie" and "Show Them Love" addressing political instability, the Jos crises, child abuse, militancy and social injustices. According to music critic Will Witney of Okay Africa "No Man Stands Alone features a mixture of sounds, including several songs which weave together the increasingly popular mixture of hip-hop with live African instrumentation, synthesizers and programmed drums"

Track listing
Marching To Aso (Feature Artist – Azadus)
No Man Stands Alone (Feature Artist – Lord Of Ajasa)
Ni Bo L’Anlo (Feature Artist – Fatai Rolling Dollar, Oranmiyan, Wurasamba)
Yanga (Feature Artist – Sehinde Jo)
I'm Waiting (Feature Artist – Nneka)
I Lost My Faith (Feature Artist – Abiodun)
Dem Dey Lie (Feature Artist – Sound Sultan)
Show Them Love (Feature Artist – African China)
Travel & Sea (Feature Artist – Wanlov The Kubolor)
Turn Me On (Feature Artist – Dabyna Poll-Abraham)

Personnel
Sukanmi Alfred- Guitar ("No Man Stands Alone")
Fatai Rolling Dollar- Guitar ("Ni Bo l'ade")
Godwin Okwe - Trumpet ("Ni Bo L'ade")
Oyin Ogungbade Samuel - Saxophone ("Ni Bo L'ade")
Ibukun Joseph - Backing vocals ("Yanga")
Ayankehinde Adeniyi - Talking Drum ("Yanga")
Dabyna Poll-Abraham - Guitar ("Turn Me On")

References

2010 albums
Bantu (band) albums
Afrobeat albums
Yoruba music